George Holburn Snowden NA (December 17, 1901 – December 15, 1990) was an American sculptor. He was elected to the National Academy of Design in 1941, was recipient of the 1927 Rome Prize as well as receiving the Royal Academy Order of Merit. He was an apprentice to Robert George Eberhard, chairman of the Yale School of Sculpture and protégé of Auguste Rodin. Rodin bequeathed his sculpting tools to Eberhard, who in turn passed them to George. George's daughter M.L. Snowden apprenticed under him, and later received Rodin's tools. George's work was featured in a retrospective at the Smithsonian.

Notable works
The sculptures on the 161st Street side of the Bronx County Courthouse (c. 1934)
Pediment on The Drinkhall, Saratoga Springs, New York

References

American architectural sculptors
American male sculptors
American medallists
National Academy of Design members
1901 births
1990 deaths
20th-century American sculptors
20th-century American male artists